NWBL may refer to:

 National Women's Basketball League, United States
 National Wheelchair Basketball League (Australia)